Anveshana (meaning: Exploration) is a novel written by S. L. Bhyrappa, which was first published on 1976. As of May 2018, it had 13 reprints and has been translated into Hindi and Marathi languages.

References 

Kannada novels
1976 novels
1976 Indian novels
Novels by S. L. Bhyrappa